Edwin (born 24 April 1978) is an Indonesian film director, producer, and screenwriter. He has won a total of four Citra Awards: Best Short Film for Kara, Anak Sebatang Pohon (2005), Best Director for Posesif (2017), as well as Best Director and Best Adapted Screenplay (shared with Eka Kurniawan) for Vengeance is Mine, All Others Pay Cash (2022). His feature film debut Blind Pig Who Wants to Fly (2008) earned critical acclaim and won several international festival awards. In 2012, Edwin received the Edward Yang New Talent Award at the 6th Asian Film Awards.

In 2012, Edwin's sophomore feature Postcards from the Zoo was selected to compete in the main section of the 62nd Berlin International Film Festival, making him the first Indonesian filmmaker to compete for the prestigious Golden Bear in 49 years. In 2021, Edwin won Golden Leopard at the 74th Locarno Film Festival with Vengeance Is Mine, All Others Pay Cash.

Career 
Edwin first came to prominence in Indonesia as the filmmaker behind Kara, Anak Sebatang Pohon (2005), a short film telling the story of a little girl living in an isolated place. The film was received positively and earned Edwin a Citra Award for Best Short Film at that year's Indonesian Film Festival. Internationally, Edwin made a name for himself with the 2005 silent short film Dajang Soembi, the Woman Who Was Married to a Dog. Throughout 2015, the film competed at the International Short Film Festival Hamburg, the Vancouver International Film Festival, and the Taipei Golden Horse Film Festival.

His breakthrough came with his award-winning feature film directorial debut Blind Pig Who Wants to Fly in 2008. He followed this up with Postcards from the Zoo in 2012, Someone's Wife in the Boat of Someone's Husband in 2013, Posesif in 2017, and Aruna & Her Palate in 2018. For the latter two, Edwin received two consecutive Citra Award nominations for Best Director, winning for Posesif.

His latest project is an adaptation of Eka Kurniawan's best-selling book Vengeance Is Mine, All Others Pay Cash which will star Ladya Cheryl, with whom Edwin has collaborated frequently, including his first two feature releases and several of his short films. It was released in August 2021 at the 74th Locarno Film Festival, where it won Golden Leopard, making Edwin the first Indonesian filmmaker to do so.

Filmography

Short films

Awards and nominations

References

External links

Living people
1978 births
Indonesian film directors
Indonesian screenwriters
Indonesian film producers
Citra Award winners